Anthony O'Regan (27 July 1809 – 13 November 1866) was an Irish prelate of the Catholic Church. He served as Bishop of Chicago in the United States from 1854 to 1858.

Biography
Anthony O'Regan was born in Lavalleyroe, County Mayo, and studied at Maynooth College. Following his ordination to the priesthood on 29 November 1834, he was appointed by Archbishop John MacHale to be professor of Scripture, Hebrew and dogmatic theology at St. Jarlath's College, where he later served as President from 1844 to 1849. He accepted an invitation from Archbishop Peter Richard Kenrick in 1849 to head the newly established theological seminary at Cardondelet, on the outskirts of St. Louis, Missouri, in the United States.

On 9 December 1853, O'Regan was appointed the third Bishop of Chicago, Illinois, by Pope Pius IX. He initially refused the appointment, feeling that his quiet scholarly background made him unsuitable for such an office, but accepted after the Holy See sent him a mandate in June 1854. He received his episcopal consecration on 25 July 1854, from Archbishop Kenrick, with Bishops James Oliver Van de Velde, S.J., and John Henni serving as co-consecrators, at the Cathedral of St. Louis. After a severe spell of nervous debility, he finally reached Chicago and was solemnly installed as Bishop on the following 3 September. He soon began construction on a new episcopal residence, completed in 1856 but later destroyed by the Great Chicago Fire in 1871.

During his tenure, O'Regan established the Jesuits and the Redemptorists, and purchased property for several churches and Calvary Cemetery. A systematic administrator and strong disciplinarian, however, he excited much dissatisfaction among his clergy. He was also accused of discriminating against his French-speaking congregations. Distressed by the frequent opposition his administration met, he submitted his resignation in 1857; the Holy See accepted on 25 June 1858, and named him Titular Bishop of Dora.

O'Regan retired to London, England, where he befriended the likes of Nicholas Wiseman and Henry Edward Manning, and later died from liver disease at age 57. His funeral Mass was celebrated by Archbishop MacHale at Tuam Cathedral, and his remains were buried in Cloonfad.

References

1809 births
1866 deaths
19th-century Irish Roman Catholic priests
19th-century Roman Catholic bishops in the United States
Alumni of St Patrick's College, Maynooth
Irish emigrants to the United States (before 1923)
Religious leaders from County Mayo
Roman Catholic bishops of Chicago